The Women's Long Jump event at the 2010 South American Games was held on March 20 at 17:30.

Medalists

Records

Results
Results were published.

Final

†: Not eligible for the South American Under-23 Championships.

See also
2010 South American Under-23 Championships in Athletics

References

External links
Final

Long Jump W